Fixed point may refer to:

 Fixed point (mathematics), a value that does not change under a given transformation
 Fixed-point arithmetic, a manner of doing arithmetic on computers
 Fixed point, a benchmark (surveying) used by geodesists
 Fixed point join, also called a recursive join
 Fixed point, in quantum field theory, a coupling where the beta function vanishes – see